Melissa Torres Sandoval (born 3 February 1984) is a Mexican former tennis player who now serves as a federal lawmaker.

Life
Torres Sandoval was born in Mexico City. She is an alumna of the Universidad Anáhuac, where she obtained her bachelor's degree in business administration in 2008 and a master's degree in journalism in 2014.

Tennis career
Torres Sandoval has a career-high singles ranking by the Women's Tennis Association (WTA) of 227, achieved on 18 February 2008. She also has a career-high WTA doubles ranking of 207, set on 25 November 2002. Torres Sandoval won six singles and six doubles titles on the ITF Circuit.

Playing for Mexico Fed Cup team, she has a win–loss record of 18–13 in Fed Cup competition.

Torres Sandoval made her WTA Tour debut at the 2007 Abierto Mexicano Telcel. Having entered the tournament with a wildcard in the main draw, she defeated Nicole Pratt and Eva Birnerová in the quarterfinals, before losing to Julia Schruff.

She retired from tennis after the 2009 Abierto Mexicano Telcel in Acapulco, where she lost in the first round to Pauline Parmentier. After her retirement, she became a commentator for ESPN and Uno TV.

Political career
In 2013, she began a two-year stint as an adjunct director general of the National Security Commission, a division of the Secretariat of the Interior.

In 2015, the Social Encounter Party placed Torres Sandoval second on their list of proportional representation federal deputies from the fourth electoral region, assuring her of a seat in the LXIII Legislature of the Mexican Congress. She serves on eight commissions including Health, Public Security, Gender Alert, Foreign Relations, and Bicameral for Dialogue and Conciliation in Chiapas.

ITF finals

Singles (6–3)

Doubles (6–4)

References

External links
 
 
 

1984 births
Living people
Mexican female tennis players
Tennis players from Mexico City
Tennis players at the 2007 Pan American Games
21st-century Mexican politicians
Members of the Chamber of Deputies (Mexico)
Pan American Games medalists in tennis
Pan American Games bronze medalists for Mexico
Universiade medalists in tennis
Central American and Caribbean Games gold medalists for Mexico
Central American and Caribbean Games silver medalists for Mexico
Central American and Caribbean Games bronze medalists for Mexico
Competitors at the 2002 Central American and Caribbean Games
Competitors at the 2006 Central American and Caribbean Games
Competitors at the 2010 Central American and Caribbean Games
Universiade bronze medalists for Mexico
Central American and Caribbean Games medalists in tennis
Medalists at the 2009 Summer Universiade
Tennis players at the 2003 Pan American Games
Medalists at the 2003 Pan American Games
Deputies of the LXIII Legislature of Mexico